Raghu Raj Bahadur (30 April 1924 – 7 June 1997) was an Indian statistician considered by peers to be "one of the architects of the modern theory of mathematical statistics".

Biography

Bahadur was born in Delhi, India, and received his BA (1943) and MA (1945) in mathematics from St. Stephen’s College, University of Delhi . He received his doctorate from the University of North Carolina under Herbert Robbins in 1950 after which he joined University of Chicago.  He worked as a research statistician at the Indian Statistical Institute in Calcutta from 1956 to 1961. He spent the remainder of his academic career in the University of Chicago. He is a cousin to Madhur Jaffrey.

Contributions

He published numerous papers and is best known for the concepts of "Bahadur efficiency" and the Bahadur–Ghosh–Kiefer representation (with J. K. Ghosh and Jack Kiefer).

He also framed the Anderson–Bahadur algorithm along with Theodore Wilbur Anderson which is used in statistics and engineering for solving binary classification problems when the underlying data have multivariate normal distributions with different covariance matrices.

Legacy
He held the John Simon Guggenheim Fellowship (1968–69)  and was the 1974 Wald Lecturer of the IMS. He was the President of the Institute of Mathematical Statistics during 1974–75 and was elected a Fellow of the American Academy of Arts and Sciences in 1986.

References

External links

1924 births
1997 deaths
Indian statisticians
20th-century Indian mathematicians
American statisticians
20th-century American mathematicians
Fellows of the American Academy of Arts and Sciences
Presidents of the Institute of Mathematical Statistics
University of Chicago faculty
American academics of Indian descent
Scientists from Delhi
Indian emigrants to the United States
Mathematical statisticians